Petar Tsvetanov (born 30 August 1968) is a retired Bulgarian football defender.

References

1972 births
Living people
Bulgarian footballers
PFC CSKA Sofia players
FC Haskovo players
PFC Slavia Sofia players
A.P.O. Akratitos Ano Liosia players
Thrasyvoulos F.C. players
Association football defenders
Bulgarian expatriate footballers
Expatriate footballers in Greece
Bulgarian expatriate sportspeople in Greece